Knock on Wood is a 1954 American comedy film starring Danny Kaye and Mai Zetterling. Other actors in the film include Torin Thatcher, David Burns, and Leon Askin.  The film was written and directed by Melvin Frank and Norman Panama, with songs by Kaye's wife, Sylvia Fine.

Plot
Jerry Morgan (Kaye) is a ventriloquist who is having trouble with love:  just when his relationship with a woman gets around to marriage, his dummy turns jealous and spoils everything. Jerry's manager Marty threatens to quit unless Jerry sees a psychiatrist, Ilse Nordstrom (Zetterling), who tries to discover the source of his problem. The two of them eventually fall in love.

At the same time, Jerry becomes unwittingly intertwined with spies and has to run from the police. In his escape, he finds himself impersonating a British car salesman, trying to demonstrate a new convertible with loads of bells and whistles. Later on, he finds himself on stage in the middle of the performance of an exotic ballet.

Cast

Production notes
The film features dialogue with linguistic play (particularly the names of the dummies "Clarence" and "Terrence" and the Slavic names of the spies) which would also be a feature of Kaye's later film The Court Jester (likewise written and directed by Frank and Panama).

The title song "Knock on Wood" should not be confused with "Everybody Thinks I'm Crazy" from the 1941 cartoon entitled Woody Woodpecker, starring the character of the same name; or the song "Knock on Wood" from the 1942 film, Casablanca (with music by M.K. Jerome and lyrics by Jack Scholl). Kaye performed renditions of both the title song from Knock on Wood and "The Woody Woodpecker Song," which are found on the album The Best of Danny Kaye [Spectrum, 2000].

DVD release
Knock on Wood was issued as a region 2 DVD in March 2009.

References

External links
 
 
 

1954 films
American spy comedy films
Cold War spy films
1950s English-language films
Films about psychiatry
Films directed by Norman Panama
Films directed by Melvin Frank
Paramount Pictures films
1950s spy comedy films
Ventriloquism
Films shot in Los Angeles
1950s psychological films
Films set in Paris
Films set in London
1954 comedy films
1950s American films